Eunan is a common name:

 Adomnán ( 679–704), abbot of Iona
 Eunan O'Halpin, Irish academic
 Eunan O'Kane (born 1990), Irish professional footballer
 Eunan O'Neill (born 1982), Irish television presenter

Eunan may also refer to:
 St Eunan's Cathedral (disambiguation), Christian churches
 St Eunan's College, a school
 St Eunan's GAA, a Gaelic football and hurling club

English-language masculine given names
Masculine given names